Tweek and Craig refer to the characters Tweek Tweak and Craig Tucker in South Park, who have been featured in the following eponymous episodes:

 Tweek vs. Craig, Season 3, Episode 5
 Tweek x Craig, Season 19, Episode 6